Oxynoemacheilus frenatus, the banded Tigris loach, is a species of ray-finned fish in the genus Oxynoemacheilus. This species is widespread in the upper drainage basin of the Tigris in Turkey, Syria and Iraq where it can be locally very common. It can be found in habitats varying from streams with a moderately fast current to near standing waters in springs, streams and rivers which have beds of gravel or mud.

Footnotes 

frenatus
Taxa named by Johann Jakob Heckel
Fish described in 1843